The 2004 Stockport Metropolitan Borough Council election took place on 10 June 2004 to elect members of Stockport Metropolitan Borough Council in England. This was on the same day as other local elections. Due to demographic changes in the Borough since its formation in 1973, and in common with most other English Councils in 2004, boundary changes were implemented in time for these elections. Due to these changes, it was necessary for the whole Council to be re-elected for the first time since 1973. The Liberal Democrats held overall control of the council.

Ward results

Bramhall North

Bramhall South

Bredbury and Woodley

Bredbury Green and Romiley

Brinnington and Central

Cheadle and Gatley

Cheadle Hulme North

Cheadle Hulme South

Davenport and Cale Green

Edgeley and Cheadle Heath

Hazel Grove

Heald Green

Heatons North

Heatons South

Manor

Marple North

Marple South

Offerton

Reddish North

Reddish South

Stepping Hill

References

2004 English local elections
2004
2000s in Greater Manchester